Epermenia sinica is a moth in the family Epermeniidae. It was described by Reinhard Gaedike in 1996. It is found in Yunnan, China.

The wingspan is about 22 mm. Adults are similar to Epermenia nepalica but can be distinguished by the genitalia.

References

Moths described in 1996
Epermeniidae
Moths of Asia